Birch bark manuscripts are documents written on pieces of the inner layer of birch bark, which was commonly used for writing before the advent of mass production of paper. Evidence of birch bark for writing goes back many centuries and in various cultures.

The oldest dated birch bark manuscripts are numerous Gandhāran Buddhist texts from approximately the 1st century CE, from what is now Afghanistan. They contain among the earliest known versions of significant Buddhist scriptures, including a Dhammapada, discourses of Buddha that include the Rhinoceros Sutra,  Avadanas and Abhidharma texts.

Sanskrit birch bark manuscripts written with Brahmi script have been dated to the first few centuries CE. Several early Sanskrit writers, such as Kālidāsa (c. 4th century CE), Sushruta (c. 3rd century CE), and Varāhamihira (6th century CE) mention the use of birch bark for manuscripts. The bark of Betula utilis (Himalayan Birch) is still used today in India and Nepal for writing sacred mantras.

Russian texts discovered in Veliky Novgorod have been dated to approximately the 9th to 15th century CE. Most of those documents are letters written by various people in the Old Novgorod dialect.

The Irish language's native writing system Ogham, sometimes called the "tree alphabet", was traditionally attributed to the god Ogma who wrote a proscription on birch to Lugh, warning him; the text of this proscription can be found in the Book of Ballymote. The first letter of Ogham is beith; beithe means "birch".

Gandhāran Buddhist manuscripts

Buddhist manuscripts written in the Gāndhārī language are likely the oldest extant Indic texts, dating to approximately the 1st century CE. They were written on birch bark and stored in clay jars. The British Library acquired them in 1994. They were written in Kharoṣṭhī and were believed to have originated from Afghanistan, because similar birch bark manuscripts had been discovered in eastern Afghanistan. Since 1994, a similar collection of Gāndhārī texts from the same era, called the Senior collection, has also surfaced.

The British Library birch bark manuscripts were in the form of scrolls. They were very fragile and had already been damaged. They measured five to nine inches wide, and consisted of twelve- to eighteen-inch long, overlapping rolls that had been glued together to form longer scrolls. A thread sewn through the edges helped to hold them together. The script was written in black ink. The manuscripts were written on both sides of the scrolls, beginning at the top on one side, continuing with the scroll turned over and upside down, so that the text concluded at the top and back of the scroll. The longest intact scroll from the British Library collection is eighty-four inches long.

The texts were likely compiled by the Dharmaguptaka sect and probably "represent a random but reasonably representative fraction of what was probably a much larger set of texts preserved in the library of a monastery of the Dharmaguptaka sect in Nagarāhāra", according to Richard Salomon. The collection includes a variety of known commentaries and sutras, including a Dhammapada, discourses of Shakyamuni Buddha that include the Rhinoceros Sutra, avadānas, and abhidharma texts.

The condition of the scrolls indicates that they were already in poor condition and fragments by the time they were stored in the clay jars. Scholars concluded that the fragmented scrolls were given a ritual interment, much like Jewish texts stored in a genizah.

Sanskrit and Brāhmī manuscripts

The bark of Betula utilis (Himalayan Birch) has been used for centuries in India for writing scriptures and texts in various scripts. Its use was especially prevalent in historical Kashmir. Use of bark as paper has been mentioned by early Sanskrit writers such as Kalidasa (c. 4th century CE), Sushruta (c. 3rd century CE), and Varahamihira (6th century CE). In Kashmir, early scholars recounted that all of their books were written on Himalayan birch bark until the 16th century.

A fragment of a birch bark scroll in Sanskrit, in the Brāhmī script, was part of the British Library Gandhara scroll collection. It is presumed to be from North India, dating to sometime during the first few centuries CE. Birch bark manuscripts in Brāhmī script were discovered in an ancient Buddhist monastery in Jaulian, near Taxila in the Punjab in Pakistan, and dated to the 5th century CE.

The Bakhshali manuscript consists of seventy birch bark fragments written in Sanskrit and Prakrit, in the Śāradā script. Based on the language and content, it is estimated to be from the 2nd to 3rd century CE. The text discusses various mathematical techniques.

A large collection of birch bark scrolls were discovered in Afghanistan during the civil war in the late 20th and early 21st centuries, possibly in the Bamiyan Caves. The approximately 3,000 scroll fragments are in Sanskrit or Buddhist Sanskrit, in the Brāhmī script, and date to a period from the 2nd to 8th century CE.

The Bower Manuscript is one of the oldest Sanskrit texts on birch bark in the Brāhmī script. It includes several texts covering subjects including a medical treatise and proverbs. It was discovered in Kucha (currently in Aksu Prefecture in Xinjiang, China), an ancient Buddhist kingdom on the northern Silk Road, and is estimated to be from around 450 CE.

The Gilgit Manuscripts were Buddhist texts discovered in the Gilgit area of Pakistan in 1931 and include various sutras, including the Lotus Sutra, along with folk tales, medicine, and philosophy. They are dated to approximately the 5th to 6th centuries AD, and were written in Buddhist Sanskrit in the Śāradā script.

Manuscripts containing the Devīkavaca text, a hymn praising the goddess Durga, were thought to protect the person who carries them from evil influences like an amulet or charm. An example of one of these texts in Devanagari script from Nepal is held at Cambridge University Library (MS Add. 1578).

Birch bark is still used in some parts of India and Nepal for writing sacred mantras. This practice was first mentioned c. 8th or 9th century CE, in the Lakshmi Tantra.

In Indian sculpture, a birch bark manuscript is easily identified by the droop. A palm leaf manuscript is stiff.

Old Slavonic script

On July 26, 1951, during excavations in Novgorod, an expedition led by Artemiy Artsikhovsky discovered the first birch bark manuscripts in Russia in a stratigraphic layer dated to around the year 1400. Since then, more than 1,000 similar documents were discovered in Staraya Russa, Smolensk, Polatsk, Vitebsk, Mstsislaw, Torzhok, Pskov, Tver, Moscow, Ryazan, and Vologda, although Novgorod remains by far the most prolific source of them. In Ukraine, birch bark documents were found in Zvenyhorod, Volynia. In Belarus, several documents were unearthed in Vitebsk and Mstislavl.

The late discovery of birch documents, as well as their amazing state of preservation, is explained by a deep culture layer in Novgorod (up to eight meters, or 25 feet) and heavy waterlogged clay soil which prevents the access of oxygen. Serious excavations in Novgorod started only in 1932, although some attempts had been made in the 19th century.

Although their existence was mentioned in some old East Slavic manuscripts (along with a mention of Slavs writing upon "white wood" by Ibn al-Nadim), the discovery of birch bark documents (berestyanáya grámota, and also grámota in those documents) significantly changed the understanding of the cultural level and language spoken by the East Slavs between the 11th and 15th centuries. Over two hundred styluses have also been found, mostly made of iron, some of bone or bronze.

According to Valentin Yanin and Andrey Zaliznyak, most documents are ordinary letters by various people written in what is considered to be a vernacular dialect. The letters are of a personal or business character. A few documents include elaborate obscenities. Very few documents are written in Old Church Slavonic and only one in Old Norse. The school exercises and drawings by a young boy named Onfim have drawn much attention.

The document numbered 292 from the Novgorod excavations (unearthed in 1957) is the oldest known document in any Finnic language. It is dated to the beginning of the 13th century. The language used in the document is thought to be an archaic form of the language spoken in Olonets Karelia, a dialect of the Karelian language. For details and full text, see Birch bark letter no. 292.

Example
Novgorod birch-bark letter №366, about 1360-1380 A.D. Case of trampled wheat, release.

Original text (with added word division):
сь урѧдѣсѧ ѧковь съ гюргьмо и съ харѣтономъ по бьсудьнои грамотѣ цто былъ возѧлъ гюргѣ грамоту в ызьѣжьнои пьшьнѣцѣ а харѣтоно во проторѣхо своѣхъ и возѧ гюрьгѣ за вьсь то рубьль и трѣ грѣвоны и коробью пьшьнѣцѣ а харѣтонъ возѧ дьсѧть локотъ сукона и грѣвону а боль не надобѣ гюрьгю нѣ харѣтону до ѧкова нѣ ѧкову до гюргѧ нѣ до харитона а на то рѧдьцѣ и послусѣ давыдъ лукѣнъ сынъ и сьтьпанъ таишѣнъ

Translation (with explanations in square brackets):
Here, Yakov has settled with Gyurgiy and with Khariton by courtless deed Gyurgiy has gotten [at court] concerning trampled [by horses] wheat and Khariton concerning his loss. Gyurgiy got one rouble [money], three grivnas [money], and basket [measure] of wheat for all that, and Khariton got ten cubits of cloth and one grivna. And Gyurgiy and Khariton have no more concern to Yakov, nor Yakov to Gyurgiy and Khariton. And arrangers and perceivers to that are Davyd, son of Luka, and Stepan Taishin.

Soviet Union
There are birch bark letters written in the 20th century, most notably by victims of the repressions of the Soviet Stalinist regime. People in Soviet forced settlements and GULAG camps in Siberia used strips of birch bark to write letters to their loved ones back home, due to  inaccessibility of paper. Examples of these letters from Latvian victims of the Soviet regime are included in the UNESCO "Memory of the World" heritage list. During World War II, propaganda newspapers and leaflets published by guerilla fighters were sometimes printed on birch bark due to shortage of paper.

See also
 See the Old Novgorod dialect article for samples of some texts
 Onfim – boy from medieval Novgorod, famous for his birch bark drawings
 Bryggen inscriptions, documents of the same age found in Bergen, Norway
 Wiigwaasabak – birch bark scrolls of the Ojibwa people
 Palm-leaf manuscript
 Mi'kmaq hieroglyphic writing
 Russian archaeology
 List of Russian archaeologists

References

External links

Gandhari.org Complete Corpus, Catalog, Bibliography and Dictionary of Gāndhārī texts
British Library Gandharan Scrolls
The Early Buddhist Manuscripts Project at University of Washington
University of Chicago Novgorodian Scrolls 
 956 Russian birch bark documents with modern translations
Devīkavaca at Cambridge University Library
Stemmen op Boombast, monograph by Jos Schaeken on the Novgorod beretsy (free download)

Archaeological corpora
Betula
Brahmic scripts
Early Buddhist texts
Gandhara
Novgorod Republic
Old East Slavic inscriptions
Sanskrit texts
Slavic culture